Towse is a surname. Notable people with the name include:

 Beachcroft Towse (1864–1948), English Victoria Cross recipient
 David Towse (born 1968), English cricketer
 Edward Armstrong Towse (1905–1973), justice of the Territorial Supreme Court of Hawaii
 Gary Towse (born 1952), English footballer
 William Towse  (c. 1551–1634), English parliamentarian

See also
 Taos (disambiguation)